Estanislao Medina Huesca (born 1990) is a writer from Equatorial Guinea. He was born in Malabo, and studied in Malabo, Segovia and Madrid. Medina Huesca has written several books, including Barlock: Los hijos del gran búho, El albino Micó and Suspéh: Memorias de un expandillero. In 2021, he was named by Granta magazine as one of the twenty-five best young writers under the age of thirty-five (35) in the Spanish language. He was part of a delegation of 14 representatives of "African Literature" at the 18th Fliven event He has also been awarded with the AEGLE Miguel de Cervantes Literary Prize.

References

Equatoguinean novelists
1990 births
Living people
People from Malabo